Death of Charles Thorold Wood
Death of  William Thompson
Death of Louis François Auguste Souleyet
Heinrich Gottlieb Ludwig Reichenbach, describes the eastern moa in  Avium systema naturale
Paul Gervais describes the Eocene bird genus Ludiortyx
Sulawesi pygmy woodpecker described by  Alfred Malherbe
Death of Grigori Ivanovitch Langsdorff
August Carl Eduard Baldamus, Christian Ludwig Brehm, Johann Wilhelm von Müller  and Johann Friedrich Naumann  publish Verzeichnis der Vögel Europa's. als Tausch-Catalog eingerichtet in Stuttgart. In this year also Müller began work on the illustrated book Beiträge zur Ornithologie Afrikas (1853–1870),
Ongoing events
John Gould The birds of Australia; Supplement 1851–69. 1 vol. 81 plates; Artists: J. Gould and H. C. Richter; Lithographer: H. C. Richter
John Gould The birds of Asia; 1850-83 7 vols. 530 plates, Artists: J. Gould, H. C. Richter, W. Hart and J. Wolf; Lithographers:H. C. Richter and W. Hart 

Birding and ornithology by year
1852 in science